Kpong is a town in the Lower Manya Krobo District of the Eastern Region of Ghana and particularly noted for the Kpong Dam

References

See also

Populated places in the Eastern Region (Ghana)